Leah Kleschna is a lost 1913 American silent film directed by J. Searle Dawley and starring Carlotta Nillson, a Swedish stage actress. It was produced by Daniel Frohman and Adolph Zukor under the banner of his newly formed Famous Players Film Company. The film is based on a 1904 play Leah Kleschna by C. M. S. McLellan that starred Mrs. Fiske on Broadway.

This film was remade in 1924 by Paramount as The Moral Sinner.

Cast
Carlotta Nillson as Leah Kleschna
House Peters as Paul Sylvain
Hal Clarendon as Kleschna
Alexander Gaden as Schram
Frank H. Crane as Raoul Berton
Vincent Sternroyd as General Berton
Madlaine Traverse as Claire Berton
Anabel Dennison as Charlotte
Elenore Flowers as Sophie

See also
List of Paramount Pictures films

References

External links
 
 
 1913 FP Herald Ad
 another Famous Players herald ad

1913 films
Films directed by J. Searle Dawley
Lost American films
American films based on plays
1913 drama films
Silent American drama films
Paramount Pictures films
American silent feature films
American black-and-white films
1913 lost films
Lost drama films
1910s American films